The Lola T97/30 was the car with which the MasterCard Lola Formula One team attempted to compete in the 1997 Formula One season.  It was driven by Vincenzo Sospiri, the 1995 Formula 3000 champion, and Ricardo Rosset, who moved from Footwork. However, the team's tenure in F1 was brief.  The first Lola chassis to compete in the sport since  was originally planned for the  season.  However, due to pressure from main sponsor MasterCard, the car was rushed into service a year before the initial plan.

Competition history
Lola was the second new team for the  season, the other being Stewart Grand Prix. Because of sponsor MasterCard's eagerness to get the team running a year earlier than planned, the team hastily built the T97/30 just weeks before the season began. Whilst Stewart (who had announced their entry even before the start of the  season) had completed weeks of testing, Lola had barely covered any mileage before the season opener.

At Melbourne, the first brief tests showed that both cars were slow in a straight line and also in the corners; the aerodynamics producing too much drag and not enough downforce. This also meant the cars could not get the tyres up to the right temperature. Neither driver could get near a good enough time to qualify, as they struggled in the difficult-handling cars. In the end both Sospiri and Rosset failed to qualify, 11.6 and 12.7 seconds respectively off the pace.

The cars were transported to Brazil for the race at Interlagos, but MasterCard withdrew their support (with all other sponsors later following MasterCard's suit at the last minute) and they remained in the garage for the rest of the weekend, subsequently withdrawing from the championship. 

The team were unclassified in the Constructors' Championship, with no race finishes, nor points.

Complete Formula One results
(key) (results in bold indicate pole position)

Locations
The locations of the four T97/30 chassis (as of 2007) are as follows:
T97/30-1 (Sospiri): Canadian racing school.
T97/30-2 (Rosset): Canadian racing school.
T97/30-3 (spare car): owned by Martin Birrane, the current owner of Lola. On display at the Mondello Park circuit museum.
T97/30-4 (unfinished): Lola factory, Huntingdon.

References
AUTOCOURSE 1997–98, Henry, Alan (ed.), Hazleton Publishing Ltd. (1997)

External links
MasterCard Lola team profile on F1 Rejects

1997 Formula One season cars
T97 30
Formula One cars that never raced